Sparassol is an antibiotic and antifungal isolated from Sparassis crispa.

External links
 Two new antifungal metabolites produced by Sparassis crispa in culture and in decayed trees 

Antibiotics
Antifungals